Harald Bergstedt (Harald Alfred Petersen; 10 August 1877, in Køge – 19 September 1965, in Copenhagen) was a Danish writer, novelist, playwright and a poet.

Author of the genre and satire verses (collections: Song of the province / Sange fra provinsen, 1913—1921; Wide Wings, 1919; Songs for all the Winds, 1927).

His social novel Alexandersen (1918) became a satire on a bourgeois culture.

His novel Factory of the Saints (1919, Russian translation 1924) became a prototype for Yakov Protazanov's 1930 film St. Jorgen's Day — a satire on the church and its ministers' hypocrisy.

Before the Second World War, he was a social democrat and was an immensely popular poet. Several still popular Danish children's songs have lyrics by Bergstedt ("Hør den lille stær", "Solen er så rød, mor", "Jeg ved en lærkerede"). In 1942-1945 during the German occupation of Denmark, he worked for a Nazi newspaper in Denmark, "Fædrelandet", and in 1946 was sentenced two years in prison for "cooperation with the Nazis".

In 1948, he published a verse collection named Songs in the Jail with his thoughts on his life and works.

References

External links 

  Harald Bergstedt works
  short bio of Harald Bergstedt quoting Great Soviet Encyclopedia
  about Harald Bergstedt
  "Danmarks børn lad sangen klinge", lyrics by Harald Bergstedt
 
 

1877 births
1965 deaths
Danish male writers
People from Køge Municipality